These are the squads for the countries that played in the final tournament of 1967 South American Championship. The participating countries were Argentina, Bolivia, Chile, Paraguay and Uruguay and Venezuela. The teams played in a single round-robin tournament, earning two points for a win, one point for a draw, and zero points for a loss.

Argentina
Head Coach: Alejandro Galán

Bolivia
Head Coach: Carlos Trigo

Chile
Head Coach:  Alejandro Scopelli

Paraguay
Head Coach:  Benjamín Fernández

Uruguay
Head Coach:Juan Carlos Corazzo

Venezuela
Head Coach:

References

Copa América squads
Squads